Mount Henderson is a massive mountain,  high, rising through the ice sheet  southeast of Holme Bay and a like distance northeast of the north end of the Masson Range, Antarctica. It was first sighted from the crow's nest of the Discovery on 3 January 1930, during the British Australian New Zealand Antarctic Research Expedition (BANZARE, 1929-31) and again seen from the airplane on 5 January 1930. The position was first plotted and the mountain named on 14 February 1931 by the BANZARE leader, Mawson, who named it after W. Henderson, Director of the Australian Department of External Affairs, and a member of the Australian Antarctic Committee.

References

Mountains of Mac. Robertson Land